Julian Pollersbeck (born 16 August 1994) is a German professional footballer who plays as a goalkeeper for Ligue 1 club Lorient on loan from Lyon.

A prospect from the Wacker Burghausen academy, Pollersbeck made his breakthrough as part of the 1. FC Kaiserslautern team in the 2. Bundesliga. Ahead of the 2017–18 season, he moved to Bundesliga club Hamburger SV, but failed to convince during his time there, as the club suffered relegation from the league. In September 2020, he joined Lyon where he became the backup to Anthony Lopes.

Pollersbeck in a German youth international, having made seven appearances for the Germany under-21 team.

Club career

Burghausen and Kaiserslautern
Pollersbeck grew up in Emmerting in Upper Bavaria and initially played at the local club DJK Emmerting as a youth player, before moving to Wacker Burghausen at the age of 16, the 3. Liga club, which at that time was by far the most successful club in his home district Altötting. From the 2011–12 season, he was included in the squad of the under-19 team in the second-tier Under-19 Bayern League and the second men's team in the sixth-tier Landesliga Bayern. In 2012–13 he played seven games in the Bayernliga for the recently promoted second team, and sat on the bench in three games for the first team in the 3. Liga. After the season, Pollersbeck moved to 1. FC Kaiserslautern. For the 2014–15 season he moved up to the first-team squad and received a professional contract in November 2014. The young goalkeeper made his professional debut in the 2. Bundesliga on 11 September 2016 in the 0–2 away defeat against SV Sandhausen after substituting for Stipe Vučur in the 74th minute, after regular goalkeeper André Weis had been sent-off. Pollersbeck also represented the team in the following games and stayed in goal even after Weis' return from suspension. Pollersbeck's contract with Kaiserslautern ran until 2020.

Hamburger SV
For the 2017–18 season, Pollersbeck moved to Bundesliga club Hamburger SV, where he signed a four-year contract. In the pre-season, Pollersbeck competed with Christian Mathenia for the starting spot in the HSV goal. During the test matches as part of the preparation for the season against Holstein Kiel and Sparta Rotterdam, Pollersbeck made mistakes, each of which led to goals conceded. Shortly before the start of the season, HSV coach Markus Gisdol finally decided on Mathenia as the starter. In order to gain match experience, Pollersbeck made his first appearance for the second team in the fourth-tier Regionalliga Nord on 2 October 2017. Due to poor form, Pollersbeck briefly lost his place as backup to regular third keeper Tom Mickel in November 2017. After the last game before winter break, Gisdol held an open competition for the number one spot again. After the winter preparations, Pollersbeck finally replaced Mathenia as the starter. He made his Bundesliga debut on 13 January 2018 in a 0–1 defeat in the away game against FC Augsburg. After the second game of the spring season, Pollersbeck lost his place to Mathenia under the new coach Bernd Hollerbach. After Christian Titz, the third coach of the season, had taken over the team, Pollersbeck became the starting goalkeeper again from matchday 27. He played 10 Bundesliga games in his first season as HSV suffered relegation to the 2. Bundesliga.

Also in the 2018–19 season, Pollersbeck kept his starting place under Titz and his successor Hannes Wolf and made 31 appearances in the league. Although he finished 12 games without conceding a goal, which was the second best value behind Rafał Gikiewicz from Union Berlin who had 14, he was rated the worst goalkeeper by kicker sports magazine among 16 goalkeepers rated. His training performance was also criticised. HSV finished in 4th place and missed out on promotion.

Before the 2019–20 season, a new goalkeeper was signed in Daniel Heuer Fernandes. Under new head coach Dieter Hecking, Pollersbeck was demoted to third goalkeeper behind Heuer Fernandes and Tom Mickel. He also had to give his shirt number 1 to Heuer Fernandes. Until the winter break, Pollersbeck was in the matchday squad for both league and a DFB-Pokal games. In addition, he played five times for the second team in the Regionalliga Nord. In early January, during the winter break, Pollersbeck tore a ligament in his left ankle during practice and was unable to attend the winter training camp. However, he returned to team practice at the beginning of February. After Heuer Fernandes was unable to convince in league games, Pollersbeck returned in goal on matchday 29 and played the last 6 league games. As in the previous year, HSV finished the season in 4th place and missed out on promotion.

Lyon
Pollersbeck joined Olympique Lyonnais in September 2020 on a four-year deal, for an initial fee of €250,000 that could rise to €300,000. After the departure of backup keeper Ciprian Tătărușanu to Milan, Pollersbeck became the new backup to starter Anthony Lopes. He did not make his debut with the French club until 6 March 2021, in a 5–2 victory against Sochaux in the Coupe de France.

Loan to Lorient 
On 31 January 2023, Pollersbeck joined fellow Ligue 1 club Lorient on loan until the end of the season.

International career
Pollersbeck made his Germany U21 debut in a 1–0 win over Turkey U21 on 10 November 2016.

Honours 
Germany U21
 UEFA European Under-21 Championship: 2017

Individual
UEFA European Under-21 Championship Team of the Tournament: 2017

References

External links

1994 births
Living people
People from Altötting (district)
Sportspeople from Upper Bavaria
Footballers from Bavaria
German footballers
Germany under-21 international footballers
Association football goalkeepers
SV Wacker Burghausen players
1. FC Kaiserslautern II players
1. FC Kaiserslautern players
Hamburger SV II players
Hamburger SV players
Olympique Lyonnais players
FC Lorient players
Bundesliga players
2. Bundesliga players
Regionalliga players
Ligue 1 players
German expatriate footballers
Expatriate footballers in France
German expatriate sportspeople in France